Allam Veerabhadrappa is a leader of the Indian National Congress in Karnataka. He is a former president of the Karnataka Pradesh Congress Committee.

On 10 June 2016, he was elected to the Karnataka Legislative Council. He secured 33 votes of Indian National Congress MLAs.
He is a four-time MLA from Kurogod (Bellary) and was a minister in SM Krishna's cabinet.

He was minister for water resources, environment, agriculture, and ecology. He is a close associate of SM Krishna, former chief minister.  He is a mine owner from Bellary. He played a key role in G. Janardhana Reddy's case.

See also 
 TA/DA scam

References

External links 
Allum Veerabhadrappa(Criminal & Asset Declaration)

Living people
Members of the Karnataka Legislative Council
Indian National Congress politicians
Year of birth missing (living people)
Indian National Congress politicians from Karnataka